Women's single sculls competition at the 2008 Summer Olympics in Beijing was held between August 9 and 16, at the Shunyi Olympic Rowing-Canoeing Park.

This rowing event is a single scull event, meaning that each boat is propelled by a single rower. The "scull" portion means that the rower uses two oars, one on each side of the boat; this contrasts with sweep rowing in which each rower has one oar and rows on only one side (not feasible for singles events!). The competition consists of multiple rounds. Finals were held to determine the placing of each boat; these finals were given letters with those nearer to the beginning of the alphabet meaning a better ranking. Semifinals were named based on which finals they fed, with each semifinal having two possible finals.

During the first round six heats were held. The top three boats in each heat advance to the quarterfinals, together with the 6 fastest of the remaining scullers, while all others are relegated to the E/F semifinals.

The quarterfinals were the second round for rowers still competing for medals. Placing in the quarterfinal heats determined which semifinal the boat would race in. The top three boats in each quarterfinal moved on to the A/B semifinals, with the bottom three boats going to the C/D semifinals.

Six semifinals were held, two each of A/B semifinals, C/D semifinals, and E/F semifinals. For each semifinal race, the top three boats moved on to the better of the two finals, while the bottom three boats went to the lesser of the two finals possible. For example, a second-place finish in an A/B semifinal would result in advancement to the A final.

The fourth and final round was the Finals. Each final determined a set of rankings. The A final determined the medals, along with the rest of the places through 6th. The B final gave rankings from 7th to 12th, the C from 13th to 18th, and so on. Thus, to win a medal rowers had to finish in the top four of their heat, top three of their quarterfinal, and top three of their A/B semifinal to reach the A final.

Schedule
All times are China Standard Time (UTC+8)

Results

Heats
Qualification Rules: 1-3->Q, 4..->Q or FE

Heat 1

Heat 2

Heat 3

Heat 4

Heat 5

Heat 6

Quarterfinals
Qualification Rules: 1-3->SA/B, 4..->SC/D

Quarterfinal 1

Quarterfinal 2

Quarterfinal 3

Quarterfinal 4

Semifinals C/D
Qualification Rules: 1-3->FC, 4-5->FD, 6..->FE

Semifinal C/D 1

Semifinal C/D 2

Semifinals A/B
Qualification Rules: 1-3->FA, 4..->FB

Semifinal A/B 1

Semifinal A/B 2

Finals

Final E

Final D

Final C

Final B

Final A

References

External links
NYT Olympic Report

Rowing at the 2008 Summer Olympics
Women's rowing at the 2008 Summer Olympics
Women's events at the 2008 Summer Olympics